Hassan Ghashghavi or Qashqavi is the current Iranian Ambassador to Spain. He is the former Deputy Foreign Minister of Iran since february 2019. He had previously been Iran's ambassador to Sweden from 2004 to 2008. He previously served as Iran's foreign ministry spokesman.

References 

Living people
Iranian diplomats
Spokespersons for the Ministry of Foreign Affairs of Iran
Ambassadors of Iran to Kazakhstan
Ambassadors of Iran to Sweden
Ambassadors of Iran to Spain
People from Babol
1957 births